The 11th Sarasaviya Awards festival (Sinhala: 11වැනි සරසවිය සම්මාන උලෙළ), presented by the Associated Newspapers of Ceylon Limited, was held to honor the best films of 1982 Sinhala cinema on October 1, 1983, at the Bandaranaike Memorial International Conference Hall, Colombo 07, Sri Lanka. Minister of State Anandatissa de Alwis was the chief guest at the awards night.

The film Yasa Isuru won the most awards with seven.

Awards

References

Sarasaviya Awards
Sarasaviya